Keysburg is an unincorporated community in Logan County, Kentucky, in the United States.

History
A post office was established at Keysburg in 1834, and remained in operation until it was discontinued in 1906. The community was named for John Keys.

References

Unincorporated communities in Logan County, Kentucky
Unincorporated communities in Kentucky